Jeanne Marie Justine Juilla (21 August 1910 – 4 September 1996) was a French model and actress, who became the seventh Miss France and the first Frenchwoman to earn the Miss Europe title.

Life 
Juilla was born on 21 August 1910 in Villeneuve-sur-Lot, France to Louis Jean Juilla and Marie Zoé Lautard, who was a seamstress. Her widowed mother raised Juilla alone. In May 1930, she was elected as Miss Gascony, the title that qualified her for the selection of Miss France 1931. She won Miss France 1931 title, making herself the seventh to do so. The beauty contest was organized by the Parisian Committee created by a Belgian born French journalist, Maurice de Waleffe in 1920, and was juried from among 150 candidates gathered in the village hall of the Le Journal in Paris.

On 5 February 1931, at the age of 20, Jeanne Juilla became the first Frenchwomen to be elected as Miss Europe. The contest was held in the same Persian premises as for the contest of Miss France 1931. Juilla was selected as Miss Europe among the participants of 16 different European countries. The jury of the selection was chaired by French painter Paul Chabas. Jeanne Juilla died on 4 September 1996, aged 86, in Saint-Aubin-les-Elbeuf, Seine-Maritime.

Filmography

As Jeanne Juilla 
 1932 - Sa meilleure cliente by Pierre Colombier
 1936 - Samson by Maurice Tourneur (with Simone Barillier, Miss France 1934)

 As Janot Jullia 
 1933 - Miss Helyett by Jean Kemm and Hubert Bourlon

 As Jane Jullian 
 1934 - La Prison de Saint-Clothaire by Pierre-Jean Ducis
 1934 - Une femme chipée'' by Pierre Colombier

Photos

References 

1910 births
1996 deaths
Miss France winners
Miss Europe winners
People from Villeneuve-sur-Lot
People from Saint-Aubin-lès-Elbeuf
French actresses
French female models
20th-century French women